Yakaboyu is a Turkish place name and may refer to the following places in Turkey:

Yakaboyu, İnebolu
Yakaboyu, Hafik